Persona is a South Korean anthology streaming television series starring Lee Ji-eun. It contains separate stories each directed by a different director. The first season was released on April 11, 2019.

Plot 
The series is separated into four segments: Love Set, Collector, Kiss Burn and Walking at Night.

Cast

Season 1

Main
 Lee Ji-eun as IU / Eun / Han-na / Ji-eun

"Love Set"
 Bae Doona as Doona
 Kim Tae-hoon as IU's father
 Pierce Conran as Pierce

"Collector"
 Park Hae-soo as Baek Jeong-u
 Jung Ki-hoon as Eun's yoga friend
 Bae So-young as Ji-soo
 Jo Hyun-sub as Ji-soo's boyfriend
 Andrew Royce Beasley as Eun's foreign friend
 Mario Leon Adrion as Eun's foreign friend

"Kiss Burn"
 Shim Dal-gi as Hye-bok
 Lee Sung-wook as Jung-geun

"Walking at Night"
 Jung Joon-won as K

Episodes

Season 1 (2019)

Release 
The first season was originally set to be released on Netflix on April 5, 2019 but the release was postponed to April 11 out of respect for the victims of the Gangwon Province Fire.

Production 
Mystic Story revealed on October 23, 2019 that they had decided to temporarily suspend the production of the second season as Sulli, who was cast as the main lead, was in the midst of filming the second out of five planned episodes for the series when she died.

Reception 
Persona was the sixth most popular program on Netflix in Korea in 2019.

References

External links 
  on Netflix
 
 

Korean-language Netflix original programming
2019 South Korean television series debuts
South Korean anthology television series